Cities is a bimonthly peer-reviewed academic journal published by Elsevier. It focuses on analysis and assessment of current and historical urban development and management resulting from urban planning policies, while proffering solutions in the form of more effective urban policy implementations. Coverage includes developed and developing nations. The editor-in-chief is A. Modarres (University of Washington, Tacoma).

Abstracting and indexing
 Current Contents/Social & Behavioral Sciences
 Chemical Abstracts Service
 Geographical Abstracts
 Scopus
 Social Sciences Citation Index
 Sociological Abstracts
According to the Journal Citation Reports, the journal has a 2020 impact factor of 5.835.

References

External links

Elsevier academic journals
Bimonthly journals
Publications established in 1983
English-language journals
Urban studies and planning journals